HMS Hound was a brig-sloop of the Royal Navy. She had a short history. After her launch in 1796 she captured two privateers and destroyed a third before she was lost in 1800.

Career
The brig-sloop was commissioned in April 1796 under Commander John Wood for the North Sea.

In 1797 Hound was at Spithead and was caught up in the Spithead and Nore mutinies. A former member of her crew, Richard Parker, was the "President of the Delegates of the Fleet", i.e., the leaders of the mutiny, and Wood testified at Parker's trial.

On 26 March 1798, Hound detained the Danish brig Charlotte Juliana.

Hound and the hired armed cutter  captured Minerva on 16 May.

Seahound was pierced for 14 guns but only had five mounted. She also had four swivel guns and a crew of 30 men. She was six weeks out of Holland.

On 23 June 1799 Hound encountered and captured the French privateer lugger Hirondelle, off the Skaw.  Hirondelle was armed with five guns and two swivel guns, and had a crew of 26 men.  She was three weeks from Dunkirk but had captured nothing.

Two days later, acting on information he had received of a large privateer cruising in the Bite or off the Skaw, Wood fell in with a large lugger that mounted 16 guns.  After a chase of 14 hours, Hound succeeded in shooting away the lugger's main mast and driving her ashore between Robsnout and Hartshall.  The wind was driving a heavy sea on the beach with the result that it soon dashed the lugger to pieces, and probably cost many of the lugger's crew their lives.  Wood was pleased to have destroyed his quarry however, as she was one of the largest and fastest vessels on the coast and when he encountered her was trailing a British convoy from the Baltic.

In the late summer-early autumn, Hound took part in the Helder expedition, a joint Anglo-Russian invasion of Holland under the command of Vice-Admiral Andrew Mitchell.  At the Neiuw Diep the British captured seven warships and 13 Indiamen and transports.  Mitchell then obtained the surrender of a squadron of the navy of the Batavian Republic in the Vlieter Incident. The Dutch surrendered twelve vessels ranging in size from the 74-gun Washington down to the 16-gun brig Galathea.

Commander William Turquand replaced Wood in April 1800.

Hound and Jaloue captured the cutter Rover on 10 May.  That month Hound also captured the dogger Zeelust.

Loss
Hound disappeared during a storm in the Shetland Islands on 26 September 1800, and was presumed to have foundered with all hands. Wreckage identified as coming from Hound drifted ashore on the islands of Unst and Balta.

Notes, citations, and references 
Notes

Citations

References

External links
 

 

Sloops of the Royal Navy
1796 ships
Ships built in England
Maritime incidents in 1800
Warships lost with all hands
Shipwrecks in the Atlantic Ocean
Shipwrecks in the North Sea